Shahjadpur is an upazila or sub-district of Sirajganj District in Rajshahi Division of Bangladesh.

History
Makhdum Shah Daulah Shahid was a Fourteenth Century Muslim saint recognized for his preaching of Islam in northern India. He was martyred at Shahjadpur.

Makhdum Shah was the second son of Muaz bin Jabal, a king of Yemen. Together with some twenty companions, he travelled east by the land route through Bukhara and into India preaching Islam. Eventually they settled in Shahzadpur, at the time part of a Hindu kingdom. The king was displeased with the disruption caused by Makhdum Shah and his followers and ordered them expelled from his kingdom. Makhdum Shah refused to comply and he and nearly all of his followers were killed. Makhdum Shah is buried beside the old Shahi mosque at Shahjadpur in Sirajganj District.

Demographics
As of the 1991 Bangladesh census, Shahjadpur has a population of 420452. It has 70998 households and a total area of 324.47 km2. Males constitute 52.05% of the population, and females 47.95%. This Upazila's eighteen up population is 197052. Shahzadpur has an average literacy rate of 24.8% (7+ years), and the national average of 32.4% literate.  Muslims are 85% of the population, Hindus 12%, Christians 2% and other 1%.

Points of interest
Shahzadpur is emotionally connected with the fond memory of the Nobel-laureate poet Rabindranath Tagore, who used to stay here in connection with administration of his father's zamindary. He wrote a lot of verses while living here. His Kachharibari (revenue office) is still there like the other place, Shilaidaha in Kushtia district.

Another point of interest is Naiem Hasan's House

Administration
Shahzadpur thana was established in 1845 and was turned into an upazila in 1982. Shahjadpur upazila is represented in the Jatiya Sangsad (National Parliament) of Bangladesh in the name of Sirajganj-6 constituency.

Shahzadpur Upazila is divided into Shahzadpur Municipality which is subdivided into 9 wards and 31 mahallas. The upazila is consist of 13 union parishads: Beltail, Gala, Garadaha, Habibullanagar, Jalalpur, Kayempur, Khukni, Narnia, Porjana, Potajia, and Sonatani. The union parishads are subdivided into 155 mauzas and 291 villages.

The area of the town is 19.52km2. The town has a population of 65897; male 51.95% and female 48.05%. The density of population is 3376 per km2. Literacy rate among the town people is 34.5%. The town has one dak bungalow (rest house).

The functions of Shahjadpur Upazila Parishad are regulated by the Upazila Parishad Act, 1998. Organizational structure of Shahjadpur Upazila Parishad consists of one Upazila Parishad Chairman, two Vice Chairmen (one  of whom is female) and 13 Union Parishad Chairmen.

Besides, there is an Upazila Nirbahi Officer for conducting administrative activities. There are four branches of upazila administration for conducting functions, these are the Establishment Branch, the Confidential Branch, the Accounts Branch and the Certificates Branch. The various services provided by the upazila administration are fully described in the citizen charter of the upazila administration.

Functions of Upazila Parishad 
Shahjadpur Upazila Parishad has many functions which are published in the form of a list below.

Education

University 
Rabindra University, Bangladesh is the 40th Public University of Bangladesh. This university is established under Rabindra University, Bangladesh Act, 2016. The university, which started its academic activities in 2017, is located in Shahzadpur upazilla. Its permanent campus will be constructed about 7 km west of Shahjadpur upazila town of Sirajganj. At present, educational activities are running on temporary campuses in three colleges of Shahjadpur.

Colleges 
Shahzadpur Government College, Shahzadpur Ibrahim Pilot Girls' High School & College, Shahzadpur Ghorshal Sahitik Barkatullah Degree College Shahzadpur Woman Degree College, Bangabandhu Mohila College, Mawlana Saif Uddin Ahia Degree College, Dugali High School Jamirta Degree College, Satbaria Degree College.

Schools 
Shahzadpur Govt. Model Pilot High School, Charangaru Government Primary School, Muktijoddha Ideal High School Pukurpar, Kironbala Government Primary School, Rangdhunu Model High School, Narina High School Narina Union Dakhil Madrasa, Udayan Kinder Garten, Sonatani High School, Dugli High School, Andher Manik High School, Binotia High School Karshalika Senior Fajil Madrasa, Verakhul Amena Kahtun High School, Jamirta High School Jamirta Primary School Jamirta Juhura Khatun Girls High School Jogtola Primary School East Jogtola Primary School Jogtola Dakhil madrasha Porjona High School Ghorsal Jobayda Barkatullah Dakhil Madrasa Khas Sat Baria High School, Satbaria Primary School Malotidanga East Primary and High School Malotidanga West Primary and High School Talgachi Abu Ishaqe High School Durgadah Primary School Jigarbaria Govt. Primary School Sreefoltala Jobayda Sobahan Girls High School, Daya Govt. Primary School, Daya Junier Girls School, Habibullah Nagor High School, Ag-Nukali Govt Primary School, Ag Nukali West govt primary school, Vennagachi govt primary school, Navaratna Kindergarten, Satbaria and so on.

Outside of these schools, there are a number of NGO-run schools that are also conducting educational activities.

Notable people 
 M.A. Matin, former deputy prime minister of Bangladesh
Mazharul Islam, former vice-chancellor of the University of Rajshahi and the first director general of Bangla Academy
Nasim Uddin Malitha, educationist and Tagore researcher
Arifur Rahman, political cartoonist
Uzzal, film actor.
Afiea Nusrat Barsha, film actress
Akhi Khatun, footballer
Mohammad Barkatullah (author)

See also
Shahzadpur tehsil
Upazilas of Bangladesh
Districts of Bangladesh
Divisions of Bangladesh

References

Upazilas of Sirajganj District